Sabine Appelmans and Kim Clijsters were the defending champions, but none competed this year. Clijsters chose to compete at Rome in the same week, losing in the second round in singles and in the first round in doubles (with Magüi Serna).

Els Callens and Virginia Ruano Pascual won the title by defeating Kristie Boogert and Miriam Oremans 6–3, 3–6, 6–4 in the final.

Seeds

Draw

Draw

References

External links
 Official results archive (ITF)
 Official results archive (WTA)

Belgian Open (tennis)
TennisCup Vlaanderen